Yuan Shuxun (1847–1915) was a Qing Dynasty official who served as Viceroy of Liangguang from June 28, 1909, to October 29, 1910.

Life
He was born in Xiangtan, Hunan Province. In 1877, he became magistrate for Gaochun County (now Gaochun District, Nanjing, Jiangsu Province). In 1882, he became magistrate for Tongshan County (now Tongshan District, Xuzhou, Jiangsu Province). He served as magistrate of Nanhui County (now Nanhui District) from 1886 and of Shanghai County (now Minhang District) in 1891 and 1892. In 1901, he served as acting  circuit intendant of Shanghai. He was the Qing governor of Shandong province from 1908 to June 1909. He then served as viceroy of Liangguang.

References

1847 births
1915 deaths
Politicians from Xiangtan
Qing dynasty politicians from Hunan
Political office-holders in Guangdong
Viceroys of Liangguang